The 2022 NCAA Division I Football Championship Game was a postseason college football game played to determine a national champion in the NCAA Division I Football Championship Subdivision (FCS) for the 2021 FCS season. It was contested at Toyota Stadium in Frisco, Texas, on January 8, 2022, with kickoff at 12:00 p.m. EST (11:00 a.m. locally) and televised on ESPN2. It was the culminating game of the 2021 FCS Playoffs.

Teams
The participants of the 2022 NCAA Division I Football Championship Game were the finalists of the 2021 FCS Playoffs.

North Dakota State Bison

North Dakota State finished their regular season with a 10–1 record (7–1 in conference), losing only to South Dakota State. The Bison were the second-seed in the tournament and received a first-round bye; they then defeated Southern Illinois, East Tennessee State, and James Madison to reach the championship game.

North Dakota State had previously won the FCS Championship Game eight times, most recently the January 2020 edition following the 2019 season.

Montana State Bobcats

Montana State finished their regular season with a 9–2 record (7–1 in conference), losing only to Wyoming (an FBS team) and Montana. The Bobcats were the eighth-seed in the tournament and received a first-round bye; they then defeated UT Martin, Sam Houston State, and South Dakota State to reach the championship game.

Montana State had previously played in one FCS Championship Game, winning against Louisiana Tech in the 1984 edition following the  1984 season, when the conference was still known as NCAA Division I-AA and the championship game was played in December.

Game summary
Montana State's starting quarterback, Tommy Mellott, sustained an ankle injury during the opening drive of the game and was sidelined for the remainder of the contest. North Dakota State scored four unanswered first-half touchdowns, taking a 28–0 lead en route to a 38–10 final and the program's ninth FCS title in 11 seasons. Fullback Hunter Luepke of North Dakota State rushed for three touchdowns and was named most valuable player.

Statistics

References

External links
 Game statistics at statbroadcast.com

Championship Game
NCAA Division I Football Championship Games
Montana State Bobcats football games
North Dakota State Bison football games
American football in the Dallas–Fort Worth metroplex
Sports in Frisco, Texas
NCAA Division I Football Championship Game
NCAA Division I Football Championship Game